Richard Blike, Bleak or Bleck (by 1517 – 1557), of New Radnor, was a Welsh politician.

Family
Blike married Catharine Dunn, daughter of Lewis Dunn of Badland. They had one daughter, and Catharine died at some point before 1544. He then married Eleanor Vaughan, the daughter of James Vaughan of Hergest, Herefordshire. They had one son and three daughters.

Career
He was appointed the first escheator of Radnorshire in 1541, appointed again in 1546 and made High Sheriff of Radnorshire for 1453–54. He was a Member (MP) of the Parliament of England for New Radnor Boroughs in 1555 and Radnorshire in 1547.

References

1557 deaths
16th-century Welsh politicians
Members of the Parliament of England (pre-1707) for constituencies in Wales
High Sheriffs of Radnorshire
English MPs 1547–1552
English MPs 1555
Year of birth uncertain